Jerry Kasenetz is an American bubblegum pop producer who worked with Jeffry Katz, the two working together as the Super K Productions company, to manufacture and produce bands such as Kasenetz-Katz Singing Orchestral Circus, The Music Explosion, 1910 Fruitgum Company, Crazy Elephant, and The Ohio Express.

Music career
The two met at the University of Arizona in the early 1960s. One of their first projects in the music business was as concert promoters bringing the British band, Dave Clark Five to the University of Arizona. Leaving the University of Arizona before their senior year, they moved back to New York and opened a small office on Broadway. 

Kasenetz and Katz created the concept of bubblegum music. Neil Bogart of Buddah Records asked the duo to come up with a marketing name for their music. Between 1967 and 1969 some of their bubblegum music releases are "Beg, Borrow and Steal," "1, 2, 3, Red Light," "Goody, Goody Gumdrops," "Indian Giver", "Down at Lulu's," "Chewy, Chewy," "Mercy," "Simon Says," "Special Delivery," "Yummy Yummy Yummy" and "Gimme Gimme Good Lovin'."  

In 1966, their first production was with Christine Cooper on "S.O.S. Heart In Distress." The same year Kasenetz and Katz began working with an Ohio band, The Music Explosion who recorded "Little Bit O' Soul." Kasenetz got in his car and drove across the country promoting the song to radio stations. In July 1967, the song reached No. 2 on the Billboard Hot 100 chart, selling a million copies. This solidified Kasenetz and Katz as music industry players.

In 1977, Kasenetz and Katz achieved another top twenty hit "Black Betty" by the group Ram Jam, featuring Bill Bartlett of the Lemon Pipers.

References

Living people
American record producers
1943 births